Pacaya–Samiria National Reserve, is a protected area located in the region of Loreto, Peru and spans an area of . It protects an area of low hills and seasonally flooded forest in the Amazon rainforest.
Pacaya-Samiria National Reserve and the near Tamshiyacu-Tahuayo Reserve both forms a biodiversity hotspot in the Amazon jungle.

Biodiversity

Flora 
Some of the native plant species present in the reserve are: Spondias mombin, Quararibea cordata, Mauritia flexuosa, Parinari excelsa, Cedrela odorata, Ocotea spp., Myrciaria dubia, Socratea exorrhiza, Calathea allouia, Solanum sessiliflorum, Hevea guianensis, Pouteria caimito, Clidemia hirta, Ficus maxima, Heliconia psittacorum, Inga spp., Psychotria poeppigiana, Alibertia edulis, Victoria amazonica, Ceiba pentandra, Phytelephas macrocarpa, Clusia spp., Swietenia macrophylla, Asclepias curassavica, Pachira aquatica, etc.

Fauna 
Mammal species found in the reserve include: the Amazonian manatee, the red-faced spider monkey, the South American tapir, the Bolivian squirrel, the Amazon river dolphin, the puma, the giant otter, the white-lipped peccary, the jaguar, the red brocket, the tucuxi, the South American coati, the capybara, etc.

Some species of fish found in the reserve are: Arapaima gigas, Pseudoplatystoma fasciatum, Phractocephalus hemiliopterus, Colossoma macropomum, Osteoglossum bicirrhosum, Potamotrygon motoro, Brycon melanopterus, Hyphessobrycon erythrostigma, Plagioscion squamosissimus, Prochilodus nigricans, etc.

Birds found in the reserve include: the Spix's guan, the black-bellied whistling duck, the king vulture, the crimson-crested woodpecker, the harpy eagle, the blue-and-yellow macaw, the scarlet macaw, the black-throated mango, the horned screamer, the cobalt-winged parakeet, the swallow-tailed hummingbird, etc.

Climate 
The annual mean temperature ranges between 20 and 33 °C, while the annual mean precipitation ranges between 2000 and 3000 mm. It is advisable to visit the reserve between May and January. The climograph shown here corresponds to the nearby town of Nauta (93 m of elevation).

Anthropology 
Native peoples still inhabit the reserve, as well as more recent settlers.

Recreation 
The reserve has 15 authorized campsites distributed in 8 areas open for tourism; as well as 5 wilderness huts. Moreover, there are 19 park ranger stations (4 of them with information stands) and 21 neighborhood watch stations.

See also
Allpahuayo-Mishana National Reserve

References

Ramsar sites in Peru
Geography of Loreto Region
Tourist attractions in Loreto Region